Truck Busters is a 1943 American drama film directed by B. Reeves Eason, written by Robert E. Kent and Raymond L. Schrock, and starring Richard Travis, Virginia Christine, Charles Lang, Ruth Ford, Richard Fraser, Tod Andrews and Frank Wilcox. It was released by Warner Bros. on February 6, 1943.

Plot

Cast 
Richard Travis as Casey Dorgan
Virginia Christine as Eadie Watkins
Charles Lang as Jimmy Dorgan
Ruth Ford as Pearl 
Richard Fraser as Limey
Tod Andrews as Dave Todd 
Frank Wilcox as Police Capt. Gear
Don Costello as Anthony 'Tony' Bonetti
Rex Williams as Al Wilson
Bill Crago as Joe Moore
Monte Blue as Scrappy O'Brien
Bill Kennedy as Tim Shaughnessy
William B. Davidson as Stephen S. Gray
George Humbert as Andy Panopolos
Peggy Diggins as Babe
John Harmon as Maxie
John Maxwell as District Attorney Danton
Glen Cavender as Mack 
Frank Ferguson as George Havelock
Robert Middlemass as Landis
Edward Keane as Elliott
Jean Ames as Waitress

Box office
According to Warner Bros records the film earned $223,000 domestically and $13,000 foreign.

References

External links 
 

1943 films
Warner Bros. films
American drama films
Films directed by B. Reeves Eason
American black-and-white films
1943 drama films
1940s English-language films
1940s American films